Magnaghi is an Italian surname. Notable people with the surname include:

Alberto Magnaghi (born 1941)
Debora Magnaghi (born 1970), Italian voice actress
Simone Magnaghi (born 1993), Italian footballer

See also
Magnago

Italian-language surnames